Trata is a former village in northwestern Slovenia in the Municipality of Gorenja Vas–Poljane. It is now part of the town of Gorenja Vas. It is part of the traditional region of Upper Carniola and is now included in the Upper Carniola Statistical Region.

Geography
Trata stands on a terrace above the right bank of the Poljane Sora River southwest of the former village of Sestranska Vas. The hamlet of Lajše to the southeast was also part of Trata while it was a separate village.

Name
Locally, Trata is known as Trate (i.e., a plural form of the name). The name Trata occurs several times in Slovenia. It is derived from the Slovene common noun trata 'small treeless meadow', which was borrowed from Middle High German trat 'meadow'.

History
Trata was annexed by the town of Gorenja Vas in 1953, ending its existence as an independent settlement.

Church

The Gorenja Vas parish church stands in Trata and is dedicated to Saint John the Baptist.

Notable people
Notable people that were born or lived in Trata include:
Anton Dolinar (sl) (1894–1953), musician
Ivan Regen (1868–1947), biologist, born in Lajše

References

External links

Trata on Geopedia

Populated places in the Municipality of Gorenja vas-Poljane
Former settlements in Slovenia